Tommaltach Ó Conchobair, Archbishop of Tuam 1258–1279.

Tommaltach Ó Conchobair was a descendant of Tairrdelbach Ua Conchobair, who reigned as King of Connacht from 1106 till his death at Dunmore, County Galway in 1156.

O Conchobair was elected archbishop of Tuam after 17 July 1258, but not translated from Elphin until 23 March 1259. Hereceived possession of the temporalities 20 July 1259. He died in office on 16 June 1279.

References

 http://www.ucc.ie/celt/published/T100005C/
 https://archive.org/stream/fastiecclesiaehi04cottuoft#page/n17/mode/2up

Archbishops of Tuam
People from County Galway
People from County Roscommon
13th-century Roman Catholic archbishops in Ireland
1279 deaths
Year of birth unknown